Yu Lihua (28 November 1929 – 30 April 2020) was a Chinese writer who wrote over thirty works—novels, short stories, newspaper articles and translations—over sixty years. She is regarded as "one of the five most influential Chinese-born women writers of the postwar era and the progenitor of the Chinese students' overseas genre."  She wrote primarily in Chinese, drawing on her experience as a Chinese émigré in postwar America. She was celebrated in the diaspora for giving voice to what she called the "rootless generation"—émigrés who had left for a better life but remained nostalgic for their homeland.

She was more than a successful writer, but a bridge, a cultural ambassador between China and the US. In 1975, she was one of the first individuals to be invited back to China after relations between the two countries were re-opened. Her work, which until then had been blacklisted in China, began to focus on life in China. Through sponsorship of scholarly exchange programs, her column in China's People's Daily newspaper, and radio broadcasts on the Voice of America, she educated both the American and Chinese public about life in each other's countries.

Early life
Yu was born in Ningbo, Zhejiang in 1929 and moved to Taiwan in 1948 during the KMT-CCP Civil War (1945-1949).  She attended National Taiwan University, where she graduated with a degree in history in 1953.  That year, Yu emigrated to the United States and enrolled in the school of journalism at the University of California at Los Angeles. In 1956, even though she had failed UCLA's English proficiency exam and was turned away from their literature program, she won the coveted Samuel Goldwyn Writing Award, with her story "The Sorrow at the End of the Yangtze River." (杨子江头几多愁). She received her master's degree in history in 1956.

Career 
After UCLA, Yu wrote several pieces in English, which were all rejected by American publishers.  Not to be stopped, she returned to writing in Chinese and began her long writing career in earnest. In 1967, her breakout novel, "Again the Palms," (又見棕櫚, 又見棕櫚)  won Taiwan's prestigious Ch'ia Hsin Award for best novel of the year.  She continued to write into her late eighties.

Yu taught Chinese language and literature at the University at Albany, State University of New York from 1968 to 1993. She continued her writing career throughout her time at SUNY.  She was instrumental in starting exchange programs that brought many Chinese students to the campus.

In 2006, Yu received an honorary doctorate from Middlebury College.

Personal life
Yu was married to physics professor Chih Ree Sun, with whom she had three children: daughters Lena Sun, Eugene Sun, and Anna Sun. After their divorce, Yu married University at Albany president Vincent O'Leary. After O'Leary's retirement, they moved to San Mateo in 1997. They moved to Gaithersburg, Maryland in 2006.

Death
Yu died of respiratory failure brought on by COVID-19 in Gaithersburg, Maryland, on 30 April 2020, during the COVID-19 pandemic in Maryland.

Bibliography
She is the author of over thirty novels, short stories, essays, and translations.

杨子江头几多愁, /Yangzi jiang tou ji duo chou (The Sorrow at the End of the Yangtze River) 1956    
夢回靑河/ Meng hui qing he (Dreaming of the Green River) 1963
歸 / Gui, (Homecoming) 1963
也是秋天 / Ye shi qiu tian, (Autumn Again) 1963
变／Bian, (Change), 1966
雪地上的星星 / Xue di shang de xing xing, (Stars on a Snowy Night) 1966
又見棕櫚, 又見棕櫚 / You jian zong lü, you jian zong lü, (Again the Palm Trees) 1967
柳家莊上/ Liu jia zhuang shang, (In Liu Village) 1968 (also translated to English) 1968
燄/ Yan, (The Flame) 1969
白駒集 / Bai ju ji, (The White Colt) 1969
會場現行記 / Huichang xianxin ji, (When the Scholars Meet) 1972
考验/ Kao yan, (The Task) 1974
新中國的 女性／Xin zhong guo de nu xin, (Portraits of Seven Women in China) 1978
雖在西双版妠 /Sui zai xi shuang ban na, (Who is in Xi Shuang Ban Na) 1978
傅家的兒女們/ Fu jia de er nu men (The Fu Family) 1978
記得當年來水城 /Ji de dang nian lai shui cheng, (Remembering that Year in Buffalo) 1980 
尋 / Xun, (The Search) 1986
相見欢／ Xian jian huan 1989
親盡／ Qin Jin, 1989
一個天使的沈淪/ Yi ge tianshi di chenglun, 1996
屏風後的女人/ Ping feng hou de nu ren (The Woman Behind the Partition) 1998
別西冷莊園/ Bie xiling zhuang yuan (Leaving Slingerlands), 2000
在离去和道別 之間／ Zai li qu he daobie zijian(Between Parting and Goodbye) 2002
飄零何處歸 /Piao ling he chu gui, 2008
彼岸/ Bi an, (The Other Shore) 2009
秋山又几种, Qiu Shan you ji zhong, 2009
小三子， 回家吧, /Xiao sanzi, hui jia ba (Come Home Xin Mei) 2010
飄零何處歸
黄昏．廊裡的女人/ Huang hun lang li de nü ren (Two Women Reminiscing) 2015
花開有時/ Hua kai shi (A Time to Bloom) 2016
林曼/ Lin man, 2017
意想不到的結局, Yisi bu dao de jie ju (The Unexpected Ending) 2018
兒戲／ Er xi (Children's Play) 2019

Collections
 于梨華作品集 / Yu Lihua zuo pin ji, 1980

Translations:

English to Chinese

Flowering Judas and Other Stories by Katherine Ann Porter（《盛開的猶大花》凱塞琳．安．波得）

"A Roman Holiday," Edith Wharton（《羅馬假日》伊德絲華頓）

Edith Wharton（《伊德絲華頓其人》）

Chinese to English

"In Liu Village"（《柳家莊上》）Chinese Stories from TaiWan, Joseph Lau and Timothy Ross eds,1970

"Glass Marbles Scattered All over the Ground"（《撒了一地的玻璃球》）

An Anthology of Contemporary Chinese Literature II，

Nightfall（《暮》）譯者︰Vivian Hsu，Born of the Same Roots，

References

External links
 Translations of Yu Lihua's fiction

1931 births
2020 deaths
National Taiwan University alumni
University of California, Los Angeles alumni
State University of New York faculty
Taiwanese women novelists
Taiwanese novelists
Taiwanese emigrants to the United States
Writers from Shanghai
American writers of Taiwanese descent
Taiwanese people from Shanghai
Deaths from the COVID-19 pandemic in Maryland